Benda Chamber Orchestra is a Czech amateur music ensemble in Usti nad Labem, Czech Republic. It is named after the renowned Czech family of musicians and composers of the 18th century - the Bendas (František Benda or Franz Benda, Jiří Antnonín Benda or Georg Anton Benda).

History
The orchestra was founded in 1956 in Usti nad Labem, North Bohemia, Czech Republic. It focuses on performing (often unknown) pieces of Czech classical and baroque music.

Benda Chamber Orchestra co-operates with outstanding professional musicians. Currently it is led by Jiri Havlik, a member of the Czech Philharmonic.

Discography
Benda: Sinfonias Nos 7-12 (1995)

References

External links
Wiki on BKO in Czech
BKO Homepage
Czech Radio - Concert Review
Ameropa festival (ref. to Jiri Havlik)
Hornclass (ref. to Jiri Havlik)

Chamber orchestras
Musical groups established in 1956
1956 establishments in Czechoslovakia